Égliseneuve-d'Entraigues is a commune in the Puy-de-Dôme department in Auvergne in central France.

Geography
The village lies in the southern part of the commune, on the right bank of the Rhue, which flows southward through the commune.

See also
Communes of the Puy-de-Dôme department

References

Communes of Puy-de-Dôme